Amelia Elizabeth Roe Gordon ( Gee; April 1852 – June 6, 1932) was a British-born Canadian temperance activist, who was elected president of the Ontario Woman's Christian Temperance Union (W.C.T.U.) (1927) before serving as president of the Dominion W.C.T.U. She was also a suffragist, and was associated with philanthropic, benevolent, and social reform.

Early life and education
Amelia Elizabeth Roe Gee was born in Liverpool, England, April 1852. Her father, Edward Gee, brought the family to Canada in 1860. He founded a tea and spice import business in Montreal.

She was educated in the Canadian public schools and at the Royal Victoria College for Women, Montreal (now, McGill University).

Career
Besides holding membership and responsible positions in various civic and philanthropic societies, Gordon was an officer connected with the King’s Daughters, the Young Woman's Christian Association, and the Home for the Friendless. She also served as an officer with the District, Provincial, Dominion, and World's W.C.T.U.. 

When Lady Aberdeen was President of the National Council of Women of Canada, Gordon served as Secretary.

Gordon was active in evangelistic work. She served as Evangelistic Superintendent, of the Dominion of Canada from 1900 to 1918, and as World’s W.C.T.U. Superintendent of Evangelistic work among Soldiers from 1900 to 1910. In 1915, she was elected president of the W.C.T.U. for the district of Ottawa. 

For a number of years, she edited the White Ribbon Bulletin, official organ of the Dominion W.C.T.U., and was also charged with the preparation of the Bible Readings for use in the regular meetings of the organization. She also lectured, besides taking an active part in local and Dominion campaigns.

Personal life
In 1877, she married Asa Gordon (1846-1933), K.C., a barrister of Ottawa. The couple had one son, Asa, and one daughter, Florence.

In religion, Gordon was a Methodist.

Amelia Elizabeth Roe Gordon died in Columbus, Ohio, U.S., June 6, 1932, while attending a convention of the International Order of the King's Daughters and Sons, and was buried in Ottawa, where she had been a long-time resident.

Notes

References

1852 births
1932 deaths
People from Liverpool
English emigrants to Canada
Canadian temperance activists
Woman's Christian Temperance Union people
McGill University alumni
Canadian magazine editors
Canadian women editors